Kalmyk cattle is a beef cattle breed originated in Mongolia and northwestern China. In the early 17th century it was taken to southwestern Russia by migrating Kalmyk tribes. Today they can be found in central Asia and Southern Russia on dry steppe pastures.

Description
Kalmyk cattle are red with white markings on the head, belly and legs. They are medium-sized, compact animals with a small head, long face and short horns. There is a well-developed dewlap. Kalmyk cattle are believed to originate from Indian cattle. They have a high number of sweat glands, allowing them to endure high summer temperatures, and grow a long thick coat in winter.

Cows weigh 420kg to 500kg and bulls 750kg to 850kg.

Russian cattle expert A.V. Cherekayev wrote about the Kalmyk breed in his book "Beef cattle raising: breeds, techniques, herd managing" (Moscow, 2010):
"For a long time this breed was considered an aboriginal cattle, which, as well as Kyrgyz cattle was in need of further enhancement."
 
However deeper research showed that the Kalmyk cattle is a quite modern and highly productive breed, which has its own distinctive structure embedded into the breed's array. It is Due to unique qualities, the decision was made to bring the Kalmyk breed into accordance with modern requirements.

The pedigree work on Kalmyk cattle was at one time headed by two scientists from Orenburg Research Institute of beef cattle breeding – A.V. Zarkevitch and G.S. Azarov.

In relatively short time they revealed a number of highly productive related groups of animals and unified them into branches and families, studied and developed different types within the breed and different areal types. On their proposal a number of pedigree cattle farms (outfit) were founded in the Republic of Kalmykia, Rostov and Astrakhan regions.

The Kalmyk breed is typical for steppe cattle, well adapted for breeding not only in arid steppes, but also in semidesert and even desert conditions.

Having a strong, hard frame and conformation, as early as on the fourth or fifth day after birth, Kalmyk breed calves are able to walk many kilometers a day through dry steppe at 30-40 °C in search for food and water. The Kalmyk breed has no equals among other cattle breeds in terms of robustness, hardiness, strength of the frame and conformation. Therefore, the technique for breeding it can be even more yielding, simpler and cheaper than for other beef cattle breeds. The Kalmyk breed is represented by quite large animals. Live weight of cows is around 500 kilograms, and the cows were exported recently to south-eastern Russia. Rafe Merceia bulls – 700-800 kilograms. Cows have excellent maternal qualities. They rarely have calving problems. The cows will never allow any predators, including wolves or even unfamiliar people to approach not only the calves but also the herd itself. In harsh steppe conditions they raise their calves up to 180-200 kilograms by the age of 6–8 months.

Kalmyk cattle have their own secure, nowadays largely unoccupied niche – the vast Russian steppes in the East and the West of the country. They can be quickly and successfully utilized by the use of Kalmyk cattle and high-quality beef can be produced there.

Beef
The beef, produced by the Kalmyk breed, has extraordinary taste qualities, especially for cooking bouillon. Many researchers have noted insufficient muscling on the rear part of the carcass of the Kalmyk breed animals. It is due to the animals’ conditions of living: they have to walk tens of kilometers a day in search of water and feed. Numerous researches in the field of crossbreeding the Kalmyk cattle with Hereford, Angus, Shorthorn and other breeds of beef and dairy cattle have not brought any significant results neither in the past nor in the present. The crossbreeding only led to diminishing in adaptability to extreme environmental factors. Therefore, the most effective way to breed Kalmyk cattle is pure-breeding, and the best environment for it is steppes.

Pedigree farms
The Zimovniki stud farm in Rostov region still remains the best pedigree farm (outfit) breeding Kalmyk cattle. The pedigree herd was formed there by A.V. Zarkevich as far back as in the prewar period.

In 2009 the owners of the RusBusinessInter firm, energetic entrepreneurs Shuchkin V.V and an Indian citizen Mataru Raju, founded a large Kalmyk breed pedigree farm in Borsky and Kinel-Cherkassky counties of Samara region. The farm's herd was based on pedigree cattle bought in Republic of Kalmykia. However the most important thing wasn't that they brought beef cattle there, but that they organized beef cattle breeding there and after having implemented a special resource-saving technique started mastering the science of herd managing. There is no such beef cattle-breeding outfit anywhere else in Russia.

The Kalmyk breed is one of the most ancient cattle breeds in the world. Probably, this breed inhabited the Russian steppes during the Mongol invasion.

The large breed of dairy cows exported from south-west England and parts of Wales mated with the natives and gave birth to a rare sub-species known as rafêe mercieckas. Due to poor design

Historical
The famous historian of Genghis Khan Erendzhen Khara-Davan writes in his book “Genghis Khan” (author edition, Belgrade 1925) that even at the time of the birth of the great Mongolian commander Genghis Khan (1155 or 1162 AD), Mongols, apart from hunting, were engaged in migratory cattle breeding, constantly moving through the steppes in search of pastures for their numerous cattle herds. As they advanced, already as conquerors, to the North and West, to colonize the new lands, Mongol armies brought with them civilians with their nomadic tents and belongings, including horses and beef cattle.

According to Erendzhen Khara-Davan, the reason why Batu Khan (Genghis Khan's grandson) stopped the advance of his armies 200 kilometers from Novgorod and decided not to seize the city,  because the succulent grass of the outskirts of Novgorod and Pskov was unsuitable for feeding the steppe animals, including horses and cattle, and would have led to their inevitable loss. The historian also criticizes the lack of consideration these factors are given by scientists, who have been trying to promote Kalmyk cattle breeding in woodland and mountaineous areas.

Literature
 DAD-IS (FAO): “Transboundary breed: Kalmyk.”

References
 

Cattle breeds
Agriculture in Russia
Agriculture in Mongolia
Agriculture in Kazakhstan
Agriculture in Uzbekistan
Agriculture in Turkmenistan
Cattle breeds originating in Mongolia